Anton Maria Vannucchi (2 February 1724 – 12 February 1792) was an Italian professor of law and erudite writer, including poetry.

He was born in Castelfiorentino to an old Florentine family. He was related to the painter Andrea del Sarto. He studied literature in the Collegio della Scuole Pie in Florence; learning Greek under the erudite Giovanni Lami. He studied law under Anton Bernardo Ceccarelli. He ultimately obtained his doctorate in the University of Pisa. He taught initially in San Miniato, then moved to Florence. He formed part of the Accademia degli Apatisti and published in Lami's Novelle Litterarie. He was inducted in the Accademia della Crusca.

In 1750 he was appointed as professor of Medieval Law at the University of Pisa, and continued to teach there, with many pauses until 1792. He exchanged correspondence with many of the European intelligentsia of the Enlightenment, including Voltaire,  Ludovico Antonio Muratori, Metastasio, and Vittorio Alfieri.

Among his writings are:
Raccolta d’opuscoli sopra l’opinioni filosofiche di Newton edited by Lorenzo Tosi and Vannucchi, Florence, 1744.
Dissertazione del metodo di acquistare la Giurisprudenza critica, Florence 1750
Dissertazioni filosofiche ad uso degli studiosi del Gius pubblico, Pisa 1760
Posie intitolate il Trionfo di Minerva, libri tre Livorno 1768 *Poesia, Livorno 1756 in 2 volumes 
Osservazioni sopra gli Arimanni di bassi secoli (see Arimannus

Notes

1724 births
1792 deaths
18th-century Italian writers
18th-century Italian jurists
People from Tuscany